Pooraka is a suburb in Adelaide, South Australia. It is 12 kilometres north of the central business district.

History
Pooraka was originally a subdivision of section 97 of the Hundred of Yatala, the latter spanning from Grand Junction Road, at Gepps Cross, to a point north of Montague Road. It was originally known as Dry Creek after the local watercourse (Dry Creek), which is now the name of a modern industrial locality west of Pooraka, at the creek's mouth (Dry Creek, South Australia). In 1916, the District Council of Yatala renamed the suburb Pooraka, which was believed to be an indigenous Kaurna word meaning 'dry', however, according to modern expert Robert Amery, the name bears no resemblance to the Kaurna words for 'dry' or 'creek'. The term has been identified as a New South Welsh indigenous name for the turpentine tree, which is not found in South Australia.

Pooraka East Post Office opened on 1 December 1965 and closed in 1986. A railway station on the Northfield railway line (initially known as Abattoirs, but later renamed Pooraka) operated from 1913 until it was closed on 29 May 1987.

References 

Suburbs of Adelaide